Hans-Lukas Kieser (born 1957) is a Swiss historian of the late Ottoman Empire and Turkey, Professor of modern history at the University of Zurich and president of the Research Foundation Switzerland-Turkey in Basel. He is an author of books and articles in several languages.

He became interested in Turkey and the Ottoman Empire while studying at the University of Basel where he met refugees from the 1980 Turkish military coup . This interest led to a PhD thesis which later was released by the Turkish publisher İletişim.

He has been a lecturer or invited professor at Stanford University (2010); University of Michigan (2008); and other universities including the Bamberg University, and invited scholar at the School for Advanced Studies in the Social Sciences in Paris, France and the Bilgi University in Turkey. He received fellowships  from academic institutions in Basel, Zurich and Freiburg (FRIAS), and from the Swiss National Science Foundation.

He currently lectures as a Professor of Modern History at the University of Newcastle, Australia.

Awards 

 2017, Boghossian Prize for his contributions in the research of the Armenian genocide
 2016, Presidential Award by the Armenian President Serzh Sargsyan in 2016
 2000, Garbis Papazian-Prize in 2000

Selected bibliography
 Talaat Pasha: Father of Modern Turkey, Architect of Genocide, Princeton: Princeton University Press, 2018.
 Nearest East: American millennialism and mission to the Middle East, Philadelphia, New Jersey: Temple University Press, 2010. Revised paperback edition 2012.
 A quest for belonging. Anatolia beyond empire and nation (19th–21st centuries), Istanbul: Isis, 2007. Reprint: Piscataway N.J.: Gorgias Press, 2010.
 Vorkämpfer der “neuen Türkei”. Revolutionäre Bildungseliten am Genfersee (1868–1939) [Pioneers of the "New Turkey": Revolutionary elites at Lake Geneva], Zürich: Chronos, 2005.
 Der verpasste Friede. Mission, Ethnie und Staat in den Ostprovinzen der Türkei 1839–1938 [The squandered peace. Missionaries, ethnicity and the state in the eastern provinces of Turkey 1839–1938], Zürich: Chronos, 2000.
 (ed.)Turkey beyond nationalism: Towards post-nationalist identities, London: I. B. Tauris, 2006. Revised paperback edition 2012. 
 
(ed.) The end of the Ottomans, the Genocide of 1915 and the Politics of Turkish Nationalism, I.B.Tauris, 2019.

References

Scholars of Ottoman history
Historians of Turkey
20th-century Swiss historians
Swiss male writers
Academic staff of the University of Zurich
Stanford University Department of History faculty
University of Michigan faculty
1957 births
Living people
21st-century American historians
21st-century American male writers
American male non-fiction writers